The Rothschild banking family of England was founded in (1798) by Nathan Mayer von Rothschild (1777–1836) who first settled in Manchester but then moved to London (at the time in the Kingdom of Great Britain). Nathan was sent there from his home in Frankfurt by his father, Mayer Amschel Rothschild (1744–1812). Wanting his sons to succeed on their own and to expand the family business across Europe, Mayer Amschel Rothschild had his eldest son remain in Frankfurt, while his four other sons were sent to different European cities to establish a financial institution to invest in business and provide banking services. Nathan Mayer von Rothschild, the third son, first established a textile jobbing business in Manchester and from there went on to establish N M Rothschild & Sons bank in London.

From the home base in Frankfurt, Rothschild sons not only established themselves in the UK but also in Paris, Vienna and Naples in the Two Sicilies. Through their collaborative efforts, the Rothschilds rose to prominence in a variety of banking endeavours including loans, government bonds and trading in bullion. Their financing afforded investment opportunities and during the 19th century they became major stakeholders in large-scale mining and rail transport ventures that were fundamental to the rapidly expanding industrial economies of Europe.

Changes in the heads of government, war, and other such events affected the family's fortunes both for their benefit and to their detriment at various times. Despite such changes, the UK branch of the Rothschild family is arguably the most prominent of all the Rothschild branches due its elevation to the British peerage, and its continued high-profile philanthropic activities.

Involvement in finance and industry 
During the early part of the 19th century, the Rothschild's London bank took a leading part in managing and financing the subsidies that the British government transferred to its allies during the Napoleonic Wars. Through the creation of a network of agents, couriers and shippers, the bank was able to provide funds to the armies of the Duke of Wellington in Portugal and Spain, therefore funding war. In 1818 the Rothschild bank arranged a £5 million loan to the Prussian government and the issuing of bonds for government loans. The providing of other innovative and complex financing for government projects formed a mainstay of the bank's business for the better part of the century. N M Rothschild & Sons financial strength in the City of London became such that by 1825–26, the bank was able to supply enough coin to the Bank of England to enable it to avert a liquidity crisis. 

Nathan Mayer's eldest son, Lionel de Rothschild (1808–1879) succeeded him as head of the London branch. Under Lionel the bank financed the British government's 1875 purchase of Egypt's interest in the Suez Canal. Lionel also began to invest in railways as his uncle James had been doing in France. In 1869, Lionel's son, Alfred de Rothschild (1842–1918), became a director of the Bank of England, a post he held for 20 years.  Alfred was one of those who represented the British Government at the 1892 International Monetary Conference in Brussels.

The Rothschild bank funded Cecil Rhodes in the development of the British South Africa Company and Leopold de Rothschild (1845–1917) administered Rhodes's estate after his death in 1902 and helped to set up the Rhodes Scholarship scheme at Oxford University.  In 1873, de Rothschild Frères in France and N M Rothschild & Sons of London joined with other investors to acquire the Spanish government's money-losing Rio Tinto copper mines. The new owners restructured the company and turned it into a profitable business. By 1905, the Rothschild interest in Rio Tinto amounted to more than 30 percent. In 1887, the French and UK Rothschild banking houses loaned money to, and invested in, the De Beers diamond mines in South Africa, becoming its largest shareholders.

The London banking house continued under the management of Lionel Nathan de Rothschild (1882–1942) and his brother Anthony Gustav de Rothschild (1887–1961) and then to Sir Evelyn de Rothschild (b. 1931). In 2003, following Sir Evelyn's retirement as head of N M Rothschild & Sons of London, the UK and French financial firms merged under the leadership of David René de Rothschild.

Other activities 
Beyond banking and finance, members of the Rothschild family in the UK became academics, scientists and horticulturalists with worldwide reputations.

Nathaniel de Rothschild (1812–1870) was born in London, the fourth child of the founder of the British branch of the family. In 1842, he married cousin Charlotte de Rothschild (1825–1899) of Paris, France. She was the daughter of James Mayer de Rothschild and in 1850 they moved to Paris where he was to work for his father-in-law's bank. However, in 1853, Nathaniel acquired Château Brane Mouton, a vineyard in Pauillac in the Gironde département of France.

Elevation to British peerage 
In 1822, the five Rothschild brothers at the head of the family's banks in various parts of Europe were each granted the hereditary title of Freiherr (baron) in the Austrian nobility by Emperor Francis I of Austria (formerly Francis II, the last Holy Roman Emperor).  As a result, some members of the Rothschild family used the nobiliary particle de or von before their surname to acknowledge the grant of nobility.

In 1847, Anthony Nathan de Rothschild (1810–1876) was made a baronet in the Baronetage of the United Kingdom. Upon his death, the title went to his nephew Nathan Mayer Rothschild, who was subsequently elevated to the House of Lords when he was created Baron Rothschild in 1885, with which title the baronetcy remains merged.

In 1858, Lionel de Rothschild (1808–1879) became the first practising Jew to take a seat in the British Parliament.

Philanthropy 
The English Rothschilds and members of the other branches in Europe were all major contributors to causes in aid of the Jewish people. However, many of their philanthropic efforts extended far beyond Jewish ethnic or religious communities. They built hospitals and shelters for the needy, supported cultural institutions and were patrons of individual artists. Their donation of works of art to various galleries has been the largest of any family in history. At present, a research project is underway by The Rothschild Archive  in London to document the family's philanthropic involvements.

Family members 

Members of the Rothschild family of the UK include:

 Alfred de Rothschild (1842–1918)
 Amschel Mayor James Rothschild (1955–1996)
 Anthony Gustav de Rothschild (1887–1961)
 Anthony James de Rothschild (b. 1977)
 Anthony Nathan de Rothschild (1810–1876)
 Charles Rothschild (1877–1923)
 Charlotte Henriette de Rothschild (b. 1955)
 David Mayer de Rothschild (b. 1978)
 Dorothy de Rothschild (1895–1988)
 Edmund Leopold de Rothschild (1916–2009)
 Emma Georgina Rothschild (b. 1948)
 Evelina de Rothschild (1839–1866)
 Evelyn Achille de Rothschild (1886–1917)
 Sir Evelyn de Rothschild (1931-2022)
 Ferdinand James von Rothschild (1839–1898)
 Hannah de Rothschild, Countess of Rosebery (1851–1890)
 Jacob Rothschild, 4th Baron Rothschild (b. 1936)
 Kathleen (Nica de Koenigswarter) Rothschild (1913–1990)
 Leopold de Rothschild (1845–1917)
 Leopold David de Rothschild (1927–2012)
 Lionel de Rothschild (1808–1879)
 Lionel Nathan de Rothschild (1882–1942)
 Lynn Forester de Rothschild (b. 1954)
 Mayer Amschel de Rothschild (1818–1874)
 Miriam Louisa Rothschild (1908–2005)
 Nathaniel de Rothschild (1812–1870)
 Nathan Mayer Rothschild (1777–1836)
 Nathan Mayer Rothschild, 1st Baron Rothschild (1840–1915)
 Gregory Zalewski de Rothschild (b. 2001)
 Richard Anton de Rothschild (b. 1966)
 Nathaniel Philip Rothschild (b. 1971)
 Serena Dunn Rothschild (1935-2019)
 Victor Rothschild, 3rd Baron Rothschild (1910–1990)
 Walter Rothschild, 2nd Baron Rothschild (1868–1937)

Rothschild properties 

Among the Rothschild properties in the UK are:

 Ascott House – Ascott, Buckinghamshire
 Aston Clinton House – Aston Clinton, Buckinghamshire
 Ashton Wold – Northamptonshire
 Exbury Estate – Hampshire
 Eythrope – Waddesdon, Buckinghamshire
 Gunnersbury Park – Ealing, London
 Halton House – Halton, Buckinghamshire
 Mentmore Towers – Mentmore, Buckinghamshire
 Tring Park – Tring, Hertfordshire
 Waddesdon Manor – Waddesdon, Buckinghamshire
 Spencer House – St James's, London. A leasehold extending until 2082 was purchased in 1986 from the Spencer family who owns the house.

See also 
 Rothschild banking family of Austria
 Rothschild banking family of France
 Rothschild banking family of Naples

References

 Rise of the House of Rothschild by Egon Caesar Corti (1928) (reprint 1982, 2003) R A Kessinger Publishing Co, London, 2003 
 The Rothschilds; a Family Portrait by Frederic Morton. Atheneum Publishers (1962)  (1998 reprint)
 The Rothschilds, a Family of Fortune by Virginia Cowles. Alfred A. Knopf (1973) 
 Two Rothschilds and the Land of Israel by Simon Schama. Knopf, London (1978) 
 Rothschilds at Waddesdon Manor by Dorothy de Rothschild. Viking Penguin (1979) 
 The English Rothschilds by Richard Davis. Collins, London (1983) 
 A History of the Jews by Paul M. Johnson (1987) HarperCollins Publishers 
 Rothschild: The Wealth and Power of a Dynasty by Derek Wilson. Scribner, London (1988) 
 House of Rothschild : Money's Prophets: 1798-1848 by Niall Ferguson. Viking Press (1998) 
 The Rothschild Gardens by Miriam Louisa Rothschild (1998) Harry N. Abrams, Inc., London 
 Gilt-edged Life: A Memoir by Edmund de Rothschild (1998) John Murray Publishers Ltd., London 
 The House of Rothschild (vol. 2): The World's Banker: 1849–1999 by Niall Ferguson. Diane Publishing Co. (1999) 
 Charlotte and Lionel: A Rothschild Love Story by Stanley Weintraub. (2003) Free Press, London

External links 
 The Rothschild Archive – an international centre in London for research into the history of the Rothschild family.
 The Musical Associations of the Rothschild Family by Charlotte Henriette de Rothschild

British bankers
Economy of England
 
Ashkenazi Jews topics
Jewish British history
Business families of the United Kingdom
British Jewish families